Will Liverman (born May 10, 1988) is an American operatic baritone, described by NPR as 'a new, exciting voice in the opera world'. He has performed in several roles at the Metropolitan Opera.

Education

Liverman holds a Master of Music degree from The Juilliard School where he was a student of Cynthia Hoffmann, and a Bachelor of Music degree from Wheaton College in Illinois.

He is an alumnus of the Ryan Opera Center.

Career

Opera
Liverman's major operatic appearances to date include playing the lead in the Metropolitan Opera's 2021 production of Fire Shut Up in My Bones. The production, which opened the 2021–2022 season, featured an all-black cast, and was the first opera by a black composer to be performed at the Metropolitan Opera. Liverman retained the role in the 2022 Lyric Opera of Chicago production of the same opera.

Composing
Liverman collaborated with DJ and recording artist K-Rico to create a non-traditional opera The Factotum.  Inspired by Rossini's The Barber of Seville, it takes place in a barbershop in present-day Chicago.  As well as operatic singing, The Factotum features gospel, R&B  and hip hop music, among other genres. Liverman described the work as 'a celebration of being black'.

Other work
Liverman's 2021 album, Dreams of a New Day: Songs by Black Composers, a collaboration with pianist Paul Sanchez, made it to number one on Billboard's Traditional Classical Albums chart.  It has also been nominated for the Grammy Award for Best Classical Solo Vocal Album.

Norman Lebrecht, writing in The Critic, described his 'pleasure and affirmation' in listening to the album, and wrote: 'Liverman summons up a gamut of emotions and colours'.

References

Year of birth missing (living people)
20th-century American male opera singers
21st-century African-American male singers
African-American male opera singers
American operatic baritones
Living people
Grammy Award winners